Brita Margareta Johanna Hald (born 20 July 1945 in Stockholm) is a Swedish director, photographer and screenwriter.

Selected filmography
1986 – Love Me! (screenwriter)
1990 – Black Jack (screenwriter)
1990 – Pelle flyttar till Komfusenbo (screenwriter and director)
1992–93 – Lotta på Bråkmakargatan (director and screenwriter)
1996 – Kalle Blomkvist – Mästerdetektiven lever farligt (screenwriter)
1998 – Under solen (screenwriter)
2001 – Sprängaren (screenwriter)
2003 – Paradiset (screenwriter)

References

External links

Swedish film directors
Swedish women film directors
Living people
Swedish screenwriters
1945 births
Swedish photographers
Swedish women photographers
20th-century Swedish photographers
21st-century Swedish photographers
20th-century women photographers
21st-century women photographers
20th-century Swedish women
Swedish women screenwriters